The 2014 Summit League baseball tournament took place from May 22 through 24. The top four regular season finishers of the league's five teams met in the double-elimination tournament held at Erv Huether Field on the campus of South Dakota State in Brookings, South Dakota.  won its first tournament championship to earn The Summit League's automatic bid to the 2014 NCAA Division I baseball tournament.

Seeding
The top four finishers from the regular season were seeded one through four based on conference winning percentage. The teams then played a double elimination tournament. Nebraska–Omaha was ineligible as it transitioned to Division I.

Results

All-Tournament Team
The following players were named to the All-Tournament Team.

Most Valuable Player
Reed Pfannenstein was named Tournament Most Valuable Player. Pfannenstein was a pitcher for North Dakota State.

References

Tournament
Summit League Baseball Tournament
The Summit League baseball tournament
Summit League baseball tournament